Wellington Barracks is a military barracks in Westminster, central London, for the Foot Guards battalions on public duties in that area. The building is located about three hundred yards from Buckingham Palace, allowing the guard to be able to reach the palace very quickly in an emergency, and lies between Birdcage Walk and Petty France. Three companies are based at the barracks, as well as all of the Foot Guards bands and the regimental headquarters.

History
Wellington Barracks were designed by Sir Francis Smith and Philip Hardwick and opened in 1833. The Guards' Chapel was rebuilt in the 1960s after the original chapel was destroyed by a V-1 flying bomb in World War II. On 31 August 2007, the two sons of Diana, Princess of Wales, Prince William and Prince Harry, organised a memorial service in the chapel, marking the 10th anniversary of their mother's death. The Grenadier Guards, Coldstream Guards and Scots Guards currently have a company based at the barracks.

The building is Grade II listed, along with the gates and railings.

Amenities
Wellington Barracks has many amenities open to those working and living within the barracks. There is a bar for the junior ranks, which has many games available including horse racing and snooker tables. The Cost Cutter shop and a self-serve restaurant, a masseur and mess are located here. There is a single serving personnel room with Internet access available, as well as an interactive learning facility open to all serving soldiers and their dependants. Elsewhere there is an officers' mess, sergeants' mess, and a gymnasium with squash courts. The Guards Museum houses a collection of uniforms, colours and artefacts spanning over three hundred years of history of the Foot Guards. The Flanders Fields Memorial Garden is situated in the barracks, adjacent to the Guards' Chapel.

References

Installations of the British Army
Grade II listed buildings in the City of Westminster
National government buildings in London
Barracks in London
Guards Division (United Kingdom)
Buildings and structures completed in 1833
19th-century architecture in the United Kingdom